Patrick Loiseau (born 8 May 1960) is a French politician who served as a member of the National Assembly from 2019 to 2022, representing Vendée's 2nd constituency. As her substitute, he replaced Patricia Gallerneau in Parliament after she died.

References 

Democratic Movement (France) politicians
Deputies of the 15th National Assembly of the French Fifth Republic
Living people
1960 births
People from Vendée
21st-century French politicians
Members of Parliament for Vendée